D.A.V. Public School, Chandrasekharpur is a public school in Chandrasekharpur in the state of Odisha, India located in Sailashree Vihar, Chandrasekharpur - a residential township in the northern part of the temple city of Bhubaneswar. Established on 4 August 1989, D.A.V. Public School, Chandrasekharpur began with only 90 students and 17 staff members. It grew and now has over 25,000 students and 1179 staff members. It also has separate campus for elementary and secondary education along with separate hostel facility for senior secondary boys and girls.

House system
The students of Std. VI to XII are divided into 4 houses Apalla, Gargi, Maitreyi and Sikata after the names of women sages. The nominated leaders from all Houses of Std. VII, VIII, IX and XI form the school cabinet which takes oath in the investiture Ceremony organized in the beginning of the session. The school cabinet comprises the school leader, asst. school leader, house leader, asst. house leader and house representatives . The nominated leaders lead the house to participate in curricular and co-curricular activities under the guidance of House Co-ordinator and house teachers. The best house is awarded at the end of academic session.

Notable alumni

 Pragyan Ojha, cricketer who has played for the Indian national cricket team and currently plays for Mumbai Indians in the Indian Premier League
 Padmini Rout, chess prodigy, Women FIDE International Master, gold medalist at Commonwealth Games

See also
Education in India
Education in Odisha
CBSE

References

External links 

Schools in Bhubaneswar
Schools affiliated with the Arya Samaj
Educational institutions established in 1989
1989 establishments in Orissa